Schanzenfeld is a small hanlet community in the Rural Municipality of Stanley, Manitoba, Canada, located about 2 miles south of the City of Winkler. Largely a Mennonite community.

The village was named after Jacob Yost Shantz, a businessman from Ontario who helped Plautdietsch-speaking Mennonites migrate from Imperial Russia to southern Manitoba. He visited areas of southern Manitoba in 1872 to explore possibilities for Mennonite settlement.

The community is first noted on a Department of the Interior map in 1881. It opened a post office ion 21-2-4W in 1884 but it was soon moved to Winkler on 4-3-4W. The community was on 16-2-4W and 21-2-4W while the school district was located at SW22-2-4W.

Economy
Schanzenfed has a very diversified economy. The main occupation of its residents is truck drivers and school bus drivers. The local economy consists of two meat shops (Banman Meats and Southern Meats), and a feedlot that has a capacity of 699 beef cows owned by Enns Cattle Co.

References 
 R.M. of Stanley
 Geographic Names of Manitoba (pg. 243) - the Millennium Bureau of Canada
 the Dictionary of Canadian Biography - Jacob Yost Shantz

Mennonitism in Manitoba
Russian Mennonite diaspora in Manitoba
Unincorporated communities in Pembina Valley Region

Pembina Valley Region